Sabanilla is a district of the Alajuela canton, in the Alajuela province of Costa Rica.

Sabanilla town lies about 12 km by road north of the centre of Alajuela. It covers an area of 43,32 km² and as of 2011 had a population of 9,059 people.  A major coffee producing area, in which is located Doka Estate, a supplier of Starbucks. Another important activity is motocross, since they have one of the most important motocross tracks in the country, La Olla del Poás, better known as La Fergara in its locality, El Cerro.

Geography 
Sabanilla has an area of  km² and an elevation of  metres.

Demographics 

For the 2011 census, Sabanilla had a population of  inhabitants.

Transportation

Road transportation 
The district is covered by the following road routes:
 National Route 107
 National Route 120
 National Route 130
 National Route 146
 National Route 712

Settlements
 Sabanilla (The district center)
 Fraijanes
 Poasito
 San Luis
 El Cerro
 Los Ángeles
 Lajas
 La Doka
 Bajo Santa Bárbara
 Alto del Desengaño
 Vargas (Part of it)
 El Espino (Part of it)

References 

Districts of Costa Rica
Districts of Alajuela Province
Populated places in Alajuela Province